The third season of the reality television series Love & Hip Hop: Hollywood aired on VH1 from August 15, 2016 until November 14, 2016. It was primarily filmed in Los Angeles, California. It is executively produced by Mona Scott-Young and Stephanie Gayle for Monami Entertainment, Toby Barraud, Stefan Springman, Mala Chapple, David DiGangi, Michael Lang and Gilda Brasch for Eastern TV, and Nina L. Diaz and Vivian Gomez for VH1.

The series chronicles the lives of several women and men in the Hollywood area, involved in hip hop music. It consists of 14 episodes, including a two-part reunion special, hosted by Nina Parker.

Production

On August 3, 2016, VH1 announced that Love & Hip Hop: Hollywood would be returning for a third season on August 15, 2016. This season featured an entirely new opening credits sequence. It saw the promotion of long time supporting cast members Nikki Mudarris and Princess Love to the main cast, as well as the return and promotion of Masika Kalysha to main cast after a season's absence. Producer Floyd "A1" Bentley, his wife Lyrica Anderson, Lyrica's mother Lyrica Garrett, A1's mother Pam Bentley, Nicki Minaj's ex Safaree Samuels and fitness model Rosa Acosta joined the supporting cast. Ray J's mother Sonja Norwood and Willie's alleged mistress Kyesha Shalina would appear in minor supporting roles. Former main cast member Hazel E would return late into the season in a supporting role.

On August 19, 2016, Soulja Boy posted a video of himself on social media, brandishing a gun and threatening to kill Nia Riley and her alleged new boyfriend. From the third episode "For the Love of Money" onwards, Soulja was removed from the opening credits and had nearly all of his scenes deleted, essentially being reduced to a background extra on the two remaining episodes he did appear. On October 4, 2016, Soulja posted "I've decided to quit Love & Hip Hop. I feel my brand is too big for the show now. It's too ratchet." Series creator Mona Scott-Young responded by reposting a meme with the caption "If I ever get fired, I'm gone (sic) tell people I quit to protect my brand".

Cast

Starring

 Moniece Slaughter (10 episodes)
 Teairra Marí (11 episodes)
 Nikki Mudarris (14 episodes)
 Masika Kalysha (9 episodes)
 Princess Love (13 episodes)
 Lil' Fizz (7 episodes)
 Soulja Boy (4 episodes)
 Ray J (13 episodes)
Note:

Removed from opening credits after episode 2.

Also starring

 Sonja Norwood (5 episodes)
 Brandi Boyd (13 episodes)
 Nia Riley (11 episodes)
 Shanda Denyce (11 episodes)
 Willie Taylor (9 episodes)
 Kyesha Shalina (4 episodes)
 Max Lux (11 episodes)
 Jason Lee (9 episodes)
 Lyrica Anderson (11 episodes)
 A1 Bentley (11 episodes)
 Lyrica Garrett (9 episodes)
 Pam Bentley (9 episodes)
 Safaree Samuels (9 episodes)
 Rosa Acosta (7 episodes)
 Hazel-E (3 episodes)

The show features minor appearances from notable figures within the hip hop industry and Hollywood's social scene, including Brandy Norwood, Willie Norwood, Yesi Ortiz, Fetty Wap, Princess' wedding planner Diann Valentine, Bryan-Michael Cox, Teairra's friend Andrew Van Devon, Nikki's mother Michelle Mudarris, The Game, Anthony Hamilton, Jackie Long and Ray's manager Cash "Wack 100" Jones.

Episodes

Music
Several cast members had their music featured on the show and released singles to coincide with the airing of the episodes.

References

External links

2016 American television seasons
Love & Hip Hop